Gerardo López Villaseñor (born 12 May 1995) is an inactive Mexican professional tennis player. He has a career-high ATP ranking of 505 achieved on 17 February 2020.

On the junior tour, has a career high ITF junior ranking of 138 achieved in September 2013.

López Villaseñor made his debut ATP main draw debut in doubles at the 2016 Hall of Fame Tennis Championships. Playing in the doubles with Austin Krajicek, they lost in the first round to Jonathan Marray and Adil Shamasdin.

He made his singles main draw debut at the 2019 Acapulco Open as a wildcard and was defeated in the first round by Steve Johnson. He also lost the following year as a wildcard in the first round at the 2020 Acapulco Open to Marcos Giron.

Notes

References

External links
 
 

1995 births
Living people
Mexican male tennis players
Sportspeople from Jalisco
People from Puerto Vallarta
Kentucky Wildcats men's tennis players
TCU Horned Frogs men's tennis players
20th-century Mexican people
21st-century Mexican people